The women's 49 kg competition in Taekwondo at the 2020 Summer Olympics was held on  at the  Hall A.

Results

Finals

Repechage

Pool A

Pool B

References

Women's 49 kg
Women's events at the 2020 Summer Olympics